Lama Khater is a Palestinian journalist and writer who comments frequently on human rights and the Middle East. The mother of five children, she has written for many newspapers and websites such as Felestin.
Khater is a vociferous critic of Israel and the Palestinian Authority's political stands.

Silencing
Ramallah Authority's intelligence service arrested her husband many times trying to stop her writing.

On 24 July 2018 Lama Khater was detained in Hebron by the Israeli army and taken to Ashkelon Prison. On 1 August her lawyer reported she was being questioned for 10 hours a day.
Other reports state that her interrogations involved her being strapped to a chair for 20 hours at a time. On 23 August her detention order was extended 7 days for further interrogation. She is accused of incitement and belonging to a prohibited organisation.

See also

 List of Palestinian women writers

References

Sources
 Israeli occupation authorities blocks travel of writer Lama Khater
some of her articles  , The Middle East Monitor.
 Media Forum condemns storming writer Lama Khater’s house by occupation
 her articles in French PIC
 her articles in blogs.aljazeera

External links

1976 births
Living people
Palestinian journalists
People from Ramallah and al-Bireh Governorate
Al-Quds University alumni
Anti-Zionism
Palestinian Muslims
Palestinian women writers
21st-century Palestinian women writers
21st-century Palestinian writers
Hebron University alumni